Cuxac-d'Aude is a commune in the Aude department in southern France.

The French operatic tenor Léon Escalaïs was born and died in Cuxac-d'Aude.

Population

See also
Communes of the Aude department

References

Communes of Aude
Aude communes articles needing translation from French Wikipedia